Gordonia multinervis is a species of plant in the family Theaceae. It is a tree found in Peninsular Malaysia and Singapore. It is threatened by habitat loss.

References

multinervis
Trees of Malaya
Vulnerable plants
Taxonomy articles created by Polbot
Taxobox binomials not recognized by IUCN